A Kid Named Cudi is the debut mixtape by American rapper Kid Cudi, released on July 17, 2008, by New York City streetwear brand 10.Deep, in conjunction with independent record label Fool's Gold Records. Considered his breakout project, the mixtape marked Cudi's first official release, issued prior to his debut album Man on the Moon: The End of Day (2009).

Production was handled by Plain Pat and Emile; samples range from Outkast to Paul Simon and N.E.R.D to Band of Horses. The mixtape allowed a new progression of Kid Cudi with the release catching the ear of Kanye West, founder of GOOD Music, whom Cudi would ultimately be signed to later that year. Notably, the album contains the song "Day 'n' Nite", Kid Cudi's commercial debut single, which reached number three on the US Billboard Hot 100 chart.

The mixtape received favorable reviews from music critics, and is also largely credited with establishing Cudi's fan base. Cudi reissued a re-mastered version of A Kid Named Cudi, 14 years after its original release, on July 15, 2022, via Republic Records. The mixtape was reissued following Cudi's first greatest hits album The Boy Who Flew to the Moon, Vol. 1 (2022) and prior to his eighth solo album Entergalactic (2022), also preceding his 2022 global concert tour To the Moon.

Background
In 2005, Kid Cudi moved from his hometown Shaker Heights, Cleveland, Ohio to New York City in pursuit of a career in music. Upon moving to NYC, Cudi stayed with his uncle, accomplished jazz drummer Kalil Madi, in the South Bronx. While working different Manhattan retail jobs to support himself, he would go on to make several connections in the music industry, the first being American record executive Plain Pat at a Def Jam meeting. He would later be kicked out by his uncle and forced to find a new place; the parents of Dot da Genius, a new frequent collaborator of Cudi, allowed him to stay with their family in Brooklyn, as long as he kept creating music with their son. The following connection Cudi made was through a friend of Plain Pat, a high-profile hip hop producer by the name of Emile Haynie, who discovered Cudi through social media site MySpace, where Cudi had uploaded the Dot da Genius-produced track “Day n Nite.”

In 2007, Cudi would meet American disc jockey A-Trak, who would go on to sign Cudi to officially release “Day n Nite” as a single, through his label imprint Fool's Gold Records. As “Day n Nite” would climb major music charts, the three would work towards creating Cudi's first full-length release. With its production overseen by Plain Pat and Emile Haynie, Cudi's debut mixtape would be released on July 17, 2008, by NYC streetwear brand 10.Deep, in conjunction with indie record label Fool's Gold. The mixtape would serve as the catalyst for Cudi to sign to GOOD Music, the label imprint of American rapper Kanye West. Plain Pat, who was West's A&R at the time, had previously introduced him to Cudi's music. He would officially sign with GOOD Music after West called upon Cudi to help work on his fourth album 808s & Heartbreak (2008), where Cudi impressed West, ultimately contributing vocals to two songs (“Welcome to Heartbreak” and “Paranoid”) and co-writing two more (“Heartless” and “RoboCop”).

Promotion
On February 5, 2008, Fool's Gold Records released “Day n Nite” as a single via digital distribution and 12-inch vinyl. An electro-house remix produced by Italian duo Crookers and an abundance of rappers recording their own verses over the original production, helped Cudi gain major recognition.

In April 2008, Cudi released a music video for a song titled “Heaven at Nite”. Directed by American filmmaker Vashtie Kola, it features Cudi in a party scene throughout the video. When speaking on the record, Cudi said “the ‘Heaven at Nite’ is in the sense of nightlife being heaven; going out and drowning your sorrows and trying to lighten up your spirits. But at the same time, you can see it in somebody's face that their mind is on something completely different.” On May 12, 2008, Cudi released a trailer for the mixtape, which garnered considerable attention on hip hop blog sites.

Critical reception
Upon its release the mixtape received favorable reviews from music critics, and is also largely credited with establishing Cudi's fan base. Guido Stern of Rapreviews wrote “Kid Cudi is creating the biggest buzz out of Cleveland since Bone Thugs”, concluding with "We've already learned from Lil Wayne and Kanye West that the public is willing to embrace the martian—if accordingly entertaining. Fortunately, Kid Cudi isn't short in that respect, and will no doubt only improve upon his stellar debut given proper management and artistic liberation." Pinpoint Music wrote "A Kid Named Cudi blends styles, beats and even genres. From a Mims-esque 'This Is Why I'm Hot' beat in the single 'Day ‘N’ Night', to the slowed down tracks 'Man on the Moon' and '50 Ways to Make a Record' that will remind you of something by Gym Class Heroes. Heavy-hitting tracks 'T.G.I.F.' and 'Cleveland Is the Reason' finish the mixtape strong with clear influences from Mr. West on both tracks."

Ian A. of Teen Ink wrote "His work has changed my persona on rap music greatly. Everyone out there who thinks rap is stupid, just listen to some of Kid Cudi’s music and hopefully you will change your mind." In a 2013 article for The BoomBox, the author wrote: "On [A Kid Named Cudi], Cudi raps and croons over samples and interpolations of Gnarls Barkley, Paul Simon, Band of Horses, J Dilla, Nosaj Thing, N.E.R.D. and Outkast. He melded indie rock, electronica and dubstep seamlessly with hip-hop without pandering or reaching. Before Drake broke through with 2009’s So Far Gone, rapping and singing over Swedish indie poppers Lykke Li and Peter Bjorn and John, Cudi tweaked with multi-genre covers and seamless transitions between singing and rapping."

2022 reissue

Background
In 2021, Cudi revealed plans to upload the mixtape on to streaming services in the US. The early 2020s saw popular mixtapes from the late 2000s be reissued on platforms such as Spotify and Apple Music, including Cudi's Republic Records label-mates Lil Wayne with No Ceilings (2009) and Nicki Minaj with Beam Me Up Scotty (2009). In January 2022, Cudi gave an update on the process citing sample clearance issues. On March 9, 2022, during a performance on Encore, the virtual concert app Cudi launched earlier in February, Cudi announced that the mixtape would be coming to streaming platforms “very soon” and would also receive a vinyl release.

Release
On July 4, 2022, Cudi announced that the mixtape would be officially issued to streaming services on July 15, just two days shy of the 14th anniversary of its original release. Cudi also revealed that he recorded a new intro, and all songs have been remastered. On July 10, Cudi revealed the re-issue would feature new cover art. Cudi unveiled the new album cover the following day, detailing how “this photo was taken by Mel D. Cole on 9.22.08 in NYC. Right before my life changed forever.”

The mixtape was commercially re-released and made available on streaming services for the first time, on the announced date of July 15, with "50 Ways to Make a Record" being the only track omitted from the reissue. Cudi revealed that the track, which samples the 1976 Billboard number-one hit single "50 Ways to Leave Your Lover" by American singer Paul Simon, could not be cleared for an official release.

Track listing

Notes
"Intro" differs from the original on the 2022 reissue.
"Maui Wowie" features additional vocals by John Legend on the 2022 reissue.
"50 Ways to Make a Record" is omitted from the 2022 reissue.

Sample credits
"Down & Out" samples "Chonkyfire" as performed by Outkast.
"Is There Any Love?" samples "Is there Any Love?" as performed by Trevor Dandy.
"Cudi Get" samples "Wild" as performed by J Dilla, which in turn contains samples of "Cum on Feel the Noize" by Neil Innes & Son.
"Man on the Moon (The Anthem)" samples "Aquarium" as performed by Nosaj Thing.
"The Prayer" samples "The Funeral" as performed by Band of Horses.
"The Prayer" contains a interpolation of "Low" written by Tramar Dillard and Faheem Najm.
"Maui Wowie" samples "I'm So High" as performed by Grind Mode.
"Maui Wowie" contains an interpolation of "Let's Get Lifted" written by John Stephens, Kanye West and Rick Shobin.
"50 Ways to Make a Record" samples "50 Ways to Leave Your Lover" as performed by Paul Simon.
"Whenever" samples "Pink & Blue" as performed by Outkast.
"Pillow Talk" samples "Happy" as performed by Surface.
"Save My Soul (The Cudi Confession)" samples "Who's Gonna Save My Soul" as performed by Gnarls Barkley.
"Cudi Spazzin'" samples "Spaz" as performed by N.E.R.D.
"Heaven at Nite" samples "Tacobel Canon" as performed by Ratatat.

Personnel
Credits for A Kid Named Cudi adapted from AllMusic.

 Chip tha Ripper – featured artist
 Crookers – producer
 Dot da Genius – engineer, mixing, producer
 Emile Haynie – engineer, executive producer, keyboards, producer, synthesizer
 The Kickdrums – producer
 Kid Cudi – vocals, art direction, design, director, executive producer
 Patrick "Plain Pat" Reynolds – executive producer
 Wale – featured artist

Credits for A Kid Named Cudi (re-release) adapted from AllMusic.

Olubowale Akintimehin – composer
Francesco Barbaglia – composer
André Benjamin – composer
Ben Bridwell – composer
Brian Burton – composer
Thomas Callaway – composer
Tony Castillo – composer
Chip tha Ripper – primary artist, vocals
Jason Chung – composer
David Conley – composer
Crookers – primary artist, producer
Trevor Dandy – composer
Francesco De Masi – composer
Tramar Dillard – composer
Chris Early – composer
Alex Fitts – composer
Andrea Fratangelo – composer
Chris Gehringer – mastering engineer
Dot Da Genius – mixing, producer, programming, recording
Jeremy Hannah – composer
Gabriel Mark Hasselbach – composer
Emile Haynie – composer, mixing, producer, programming, recording
Neville Holder – composer
Montay Humphrey "DJ Montay" – composer
Ken "Duro" Ifill – A&R
Bernard Jackson – composer
Robert Kelly – composer
The Kickdrums – producer, programming
Kid Cudi – executive producer, primary artist, producer, sound design, vocals
James Lea – composer
John Legend – vocals
Evan Mast – composer
Tim Meinig – composer
Scott Mescudi – composer
Bryan Montesano – A&R
Faheed Rasheem Najm – composer
Oladipo Omishore – composer
Antwan Patton – composer
Matt Penttila – composer
Plain Pat – executive producer, producer
Patrick Reynolds – composer
Korey Roberson – composer
Rick Shobin – composer
Howard Simmons – composer
John Stephens – composer
Michael Stroud – composer
William J Sullivan – mixing, recording, sound design, vocals
Edward Townsend – composer
Wale – primary artist
Andre Wallace – composer
Kanye West – composer
Pharrell Williams – composer
Charles Worth – composer
Paul Zaza – composer

Release history

See also
List of songs recorded by Kid Cudi

References

External links

Further reading
 'A Kid Named Cudi' Turns 10: An Oral History of Kid Cudi's Debut Mixtape. Djbooth.net. Retrieved July 17, 2022
 A Kid Named Cudi Turns 10. Stereogum.net. Retrieved July 17, 2022

2008 mixtape albums
Kid Cudi albums
Albums free for download by copyright owner
Albums produced by Dot da Genius
Albums produced by Emile Haynie
Albums produced by Plain Pat